In Korean cuisine, garak-guksu are thick wheat noodles and noodle dishes made with thick noodles.

Preparation 
The dough is typically made from wheat flour and salt water only. Traditionally,  of salt is added per  of water. The dough is rolled and cut with a knife.

The noodles are boiled in malgeun-jangguk, a soup soy sauce-based beef broth made with seasoned ground beef stir-fried in sesame oil and usually served with toppings such as egg garnish and eomuk (fish cakes).

Garak-guksu can be enjoyed cold, in which case the noodles are rinsed in icy water after they are boiled.

Types 
 Naembi-guksu ("pot noodles") − garak-guksu boiled in a pot.
 Udong – Korean adaptation of udon, a Japanese noodle dish.

See also 
 Cūmiàn (Chinese thick noodles)
 Udon (Japanese thick noodles)

References 

Korean noodles
Korean noodle dishes
Noodle soups
Wheat dishes